First-seeded Li Na was the defending champion and successfully defended her title, defeating Peng Shuai in the final, 6–4, 7–5.

Seeds

Draw

Finals

Top half

Bottom half

Qualifying

Seeds

Qualifiers

Draw

First qualifier

Second qualifier

Third qualifier

Fourth qualifier

References
 Main draw
 Qualifying draw

WTA Shenzhen Open
2014 Singles